Marmaduke Duke are a Scottish conceptual rock duo from Ayrshire, Scotland, comprising Simon Neil of Biffy Clyro and JP Reid of Sucioperro. Within the band, the pair perform under the pseudonyms The Atmosphere and The Dragon respectively. According to Neil, the band, and its albums, are "based on a trilogy of unreleased manuscripts that a friend of ours brought to this country a few years ago. We're really just working to soundtrack those stories."

To date, the band have released two studio albums, with their second, Duke Pandemonium, achieving commercial success in the United Kingdom. The album entered the UK Albums Chart at No. 14.

Background and studio albums

Beginnings and The Magnificent Duke 
Marmaduke Duke reputedly formed in 2003. However, prior recording and touring commitments to their own respective bands meant that it took until 2005 for the band's first album - an 18-track album named The Magnificent Duke, and presented as a triptych of discs - to be released.

Duke Pandemonium
Duke Pandemonium, the band's second studio album, was released on 11 May 2009.

In Duke Pandemonium, the band adopted a more synthesiser based approach - a radical departure from their previous musical style, and reflected in the style of two tracks ("Silhouettes" and "Everybody Dance") previewed on their web site prior to the album's launch. During live performances, again prior to the album's release, the band also performed the tracks "Erotic Robotic", "Music Show" and "Heartburn", confirming their inclusion on the then-forthcoming album.

The album was originally scheduled for release in late 2006, and a three-track sampler CD was distributed to magazines and radio stations in spring 2006. However, due to the touring and recording commitments of Biffy Clyro, and the intervention of 14th Floor Records, the decision was made to postpone the album's release until Marmaduke Duke could actually tour and promote the new record.

In late 2008, it was announced that Duke Pandemonium was to be released through 14th Floor Records (an imprint of Warner Music UK) in April 2009, preceded by two singles; 'Kid Gloves' in March 2009 and 'Rubber Lover' in April 2009.

The Death of the Duke
According to JP Reid, the band's one-song conclusion to the musical trilogy, The Death of the Duke, will be "a modern classical two guitar death march. At the moment we’re working on riffs and rhythms." The band plan to record the album live at a concert, with contributions from 10 members of the audience. In 2019, when asked on Twitter about when the album would be released, Reid replied: "I'd speculate sooner rather than later and when the time is right." Neil told NME in May 2020 that they have been close to finishing the new record "for about two years” and were due to finish it in March but were set back by the UK coronavirus lockdown.

Live performances

Marmaduke Duke have thus far only played two small tours, during which they played at venues in Edinburgh, Dundee, London, Manchester, Glasgow, Newcastle, Cardiff and Birmingham. On 9 June 2009, they were added to the Reading & Leeds Festival lineup, headlining the Festival Republic Stage on the Friday in Reading and the Sunday in Leeds. They also played T In the Park In 2009 on the Radio 1/NME stage.

Live lineup
Live, the group consists JP Reid (vocals, guitar) and Simon Neil (vocals, synth, guitar and bass). The duo are augmented by James Johnston (bass, vocals) and drummers Fergus Munro and Ben Johnston. There is usually also a cloaked/masked figure on stage during performances, known only as "The Duke"; played by Sucioperro's ex-bassist Michael Logg also known as "The Big Slice". This character might be construed as the band's own version of Public Enemy's Flavor Flav or the Happy Mondays' Bez.

Regarding the inclusion of Ben and James, Simon Neil states: "It wouldn't feel right to be out and playing without them, you know?"

Discography

Albums

Singles

References

External links
 2009 Interview
 Manchester Deaf Institute Gig Review March 2009
 Duke Pandemonium Review
 Official Site

Scottish rock music groups
British post-hardcore musical groups
Rock music duos
Musical groups from Kilmarnock
Musical groups established in 2003
14th Floor Records artists